Manisha Gulyani (Hindi: मनीषा गुलयानी) is a Kathak dancer from India. She is a disciple of Pt. Girdhari Maharaj and has been taking advanced training under the able guidance of Guru Prerana Shrimali. An ICCR Kathak artiste and teacher cum performer for ICC centres at abroad. She has presented her art on various eminent platforms in India and abroad.

Early life 
Manisha was born and brought up in Jaipur, India. She started her training at Jaipur Kathak Kendra at a young age of seven.

Career 
She has presented research articles in the field of Indian classical music & dance and chaired the performing arts department as HoD at Amity University Jaipur. Her Kathak recitals include platforms both nationally as well as internationally namely Bali Spirit Festival, Silk Roads Project Venice, Nanning International Festival China, Trufesta International Dance Festival Nigeria, Culturall Europe, OMI & High Point University USA and Kathak & Music festivals in India. She is one of the founder executive member for Delphic Council of Rajasthan. She is the curator of annually organised Indian Classical Dance festival Thirak Utsav.

Personal life 
Manisha is married to Hindi fiction writer Lokesh Gulyani.

References 

1985 births
Living people
Indian female classical dancers
Performers of Indian classical dance
Kathak exponents
Artists from Jaipur
Dancers from Rajasthan
Women artists from Rajasthan
21st-century Indian dancers
21st-century Indian women artists